Peter Lamsdale (born 11 March 1971) was an English cricketer. He was a right-handed batsman and right-arm medium-fast bowler who played for Berkshire. He was born in Shifnal, Shropshire.

Lamsdale, who played in the Minor Counties Championship between 1995 and 1999, made two List A appearances for the team, during the 1999 season. He picked up figures of 1-35 on his debut for the team, against Warwickshire CB.

In his second match, he scored ten runs and took figures of 1-51 from nine overs.

External links
Peter Lamsdale at Cricket Archive

1971 births
Living people
English cricketers
Berkshire cricketers
People from Shifnal